Greg or Gregory Anderson may refer to:

Cadillac Anderson (Gregory Wayne Anderson, born 1964), basketball player
Greg Anderson (actor) (born 1961), Canadian actor
Greg Anderson (drag racer) (born 1961), NHRA pro stock drag racer
Greg Anderson (footballer) (born 1966), Australian rules footballer
Greg Anderson (Kentucky politician) (born 1983), youngest elected official in Kentucky
Greg Anderson (guitarist) (born 1970), member of many doom metal and stoner metal bands, including Sunn O))), Goatsnake, Lotus Eaters
Greg Anderson (pianist) (born 1981), American concert pianist, composer, writer
Greg Anderson (trainer) (born 1966), baseball trainer linked to Barry Bonds and BALCO
Gregory Anderson (screenwriter), actor, writer, film producer
Gregory Anderson (linguist), specialist in Munda and Turkic languages
Greg Anderson (bishop), Australian Anglican Bishop of the Northern Territory
Gregory K. Anderson, United States Army general

See also
Greg Andersen